Liberal Party of Australia leadership spill motion, 2015 may refer to:

Liberal Party of Australia leadership spill motion, February 2015
Liberal Party of Australia leadership spill motion, September 2015

See also
Liberal Party of Australia leadership spill, 2009